The following are the football (soccer) events of the year 1939 throughout the world.

Events 
Many football leagues throughout Europe are suspended or abandoned following the start of the Second World War.

Winners club national championship 
 Argentina: Independiente
 France: FC Sète
 Germany: FC Schalke 04
 Hungary: Újpest FC
 Iceland: Fram
 Italy: Bologna F.C.
 Netherlands: Ajax Amsterdam
 Poland - not finished due to Second World War. As for August 31, 1939, the leading team was Ruch Chorzów
 Romania: Venus București
 Scotland:
Scottish Cup: Clyde
 Soviet Union: see 1939 in Soviet football

International tournaments 
1939 British Home Championship  (October 8, 1938 – April 15, 1939)
1939 South American Championship (January 15, 1939 – February 12, 1939)

Movies
The Arsenal Stadium Mystery (UK)

Births 

 January 6: Valeri Lobanovsky, Soviet/Ukrainian international footballer and coach (died 2002)
 January 25: Horst Nemec, Austrian international footballer (died 1984)
 January 30: Jovan Miladinović, Serbian footballer (died 1982)
 February 3: Dezső Novák, Hungarian international footballer (died 2014)
 February 10: Emilio Álvarez, Uruguayan footballer (died 2010)
 February 12: Walter Glechner, Austrian international footballer (died 2015)
 February 27: José Cardona, Honduran international footballer (died 2013)
 March 8: Paride Tumburus, Italian international footballer (died 2015)
 March 17: Giovanni Trapattoni, Italian international footballer and coach
 March 31: Karl-Heinz Schnellinger, German footballer
 April 23: Fritz Pott, German international footballer and coach (died 2015)
 April 25
 Ahmad Basri Akil, Malaysian football manager (died 2008)
Tarcisio Burgnich, Italian international footballer (died 2021)
 June 23: Syed Shahid Hakim, Indian former Olympic footballer and manager (died 2021)
 June 27: Ilija Dimovski, Macedonian footballer and manager 
 July 3: Brian Bades, English footballer
 July 4: Kim Bong-hwan, North Korean footballer
 July 7: Armand Sahadewsing, Surinamese football player and manager
 July 10: Reg Stratton, English footballer (died 2018)
 July 11: Mick Brown, England football scout
 July 13: John Danielsen, Danish midfielder
 July 18: Eduard Mudrik, Soviet Russian international footballer (died 2017)
 July 21
Helmut Haller, German international footballer (died 2012)
Bogusław Hajdas, Polish footballer, coach
 August 7: Willie Penman, Scottish footballer (died 2017)
 October 14: Ramón Barreto, Uruguayan football referee (died 2015)
 October 27: Marino Perani, Italian international footballer (died 2017)
 November 3: Frits Flinkevleugel, Dutch international footballer (died 2020)

Deaths 
 February 13 - Caius Welcker, Dutch international footballer (born 1885)
 March 29 – Fausto dos Santos, Brazilian midfielder, Brazilian squad member at the 1930 FIFA World Cup and active player of Flamengo . (34 ; tuberculosis)
 October 20 - Otto Siffling, German international footballer (born 1912)

References 

 
Association football by year